The 1997–98 season of the Moroccan Throne Cup was the 42nd edition of the competition.

Wydad Athletic Club won the cup, beating FAR de Rabat 1–0 in the final, played at the Prince Moulay Abdellah Stadium in Rabat. Wydad Athletic Club won the competition for the eighth time in their history.

Tournament

Last 32

Northern Group

Southern Group

Last 16

Quarter-finals

Semi-finals

Final 
The final was played between the two winning semi-finalists, Wydad Athletic Club and FAR de Rabat, on 11 July 1999 at the Prince Moulay Abdellah Stadium in Rabat. Due to an interruption, the final was played very late.

Notes and references 

1997
1997 in association football
1998 in association football
1997–98 in Moroccan football